Diogo Miguel Alves Luís (born 10 August 1980) is a Portuguese retired footballer who played as a left back.

Football career
Born in Lisbon, Luís was a prospect of S.L. Benfica youth system, where he arrived at age 15. On 29 August 1999, he made his debut for the B team in the third tier, in a match against Portimonense.

After forty appearances in the reserve side, he was called up to the first team by José Mourinho, due to the lack of available left-backs. He debuted on 2 October 2000 in a home tie against Braga,  and a further twenty-two league caps in his first season, as Benfica had their worst league finish ever.

In the following season, Marco Caneira earned the left-back position, so Luís playing time was greatly reduced, being loaned to Alverca  on 15 January 2002. On 18 July 2002, he moved to Beira-Mar in a deal involving Cristiano going the other direction.

After two years in Aveiro, he moved to four more clubs in the next five years, which included a stint in Cyprus, retiring at 28 in 2009. He now works as financial advisor in a bank.

References

External links
 

1980 births
Living people
Portuguese footballers
Association football defenders
Primeira Liga players
S.L. Benfica B players
S.L. Benfica footballers
F.C. Alverca players
S.C. Beira-Mar players
Associação Naval 1º de Maio players
G.D. Estoril Praia players
Varzim S.C. players
Leixões S.C. players
Apollon Limassol FC players
Portuguese expatriate footballers
Expatriate footballers in Cyprus
Portuguese expatriate sportspeople in Cyprus
Portugal under-21 international footballers
Footballers from Lisbon